Bogotá Province was one of the provinces of Gran Colombia and later of the Republic of New Granada.

Information
Bogotá is located high in the Andes at 2620 m. (8646 ft) and is a city full of skyscrapers and is right next to colonial churches, a city of universities, and theaters. It contains a mixture of influences and cultures which include: Spanish, English and Indian. The city's distribution of wealth is mainly with the rich. There are people that are very well-off but also those who live in extreme poverty. It is a modern city with futuristic architecture, graffiti and destruction, restaurants, bookstores and street vendors who sell emeralds, thieves, beggars, street people and drug dealers wrapped around the inner core of the old city.

References

Provinces of Gran Colombia
Provinces of the Republic of New Granada